Charles Brown (c. 1678 – 23 March 1753) was an officer of the Royal Navy. He saw service during the Nine Years' War, and the Wars of the Spanish Succession, Quadruple Alliance and Austrian Succession.

Brown entered the navy in about 1695, through the patronage of Sir George Byng, afterwards Lord Torrington. In 1727, during the siege of Gibraltar by the Spaniards, he commanded , and in 1731  in the Mediterranean. In 1738 he was appointed to command , and was senior officer at this station until the arrival of Admiral Edward Vernon in the following year.

His opportunity arrived in 1739, when, during the War of Jenkins' Ear, he served under Vernon in the attack on Portobello, in the isthmus of Darien. He led the squadron into Boca Chica, placing his vessel, the Hampton Court, alongside the strongest part of the fortifications. When the fortress surrendered, the Spanish governor presented his sword in token of submission. Brown very properly declined to receive it, saying he was but 'second in command,' and took the governor in his boat to Admiral Vernon. But the Spaniard was obstinate, declaring that but for the insupportable fire of the commodore he never would have yielded. Thereupon Vernon, very handsomely turning to Brown, presented to him the sword, which is still in the possession of his descendants. In 1741 Brown was appointed to the office of commissioner of the navy at Chatham, a situation which he held with unblemished reputation until his death, on 23 March 1753. His daughter, Lucy, became the wife of Admiral William Parry, commander-in-chief of the Leeward Islands; and her daughter and namesake married Captain William Locker, under whom Lord Nelson served in his early days, and who subsequently became lieutenant-governor of Greenwich Hospital. There was a portrait of Brown in the Painted Hall at Greenwich, which subsequently passed in the hands of the successor institution, the National Maritime Museum.

References

1670s births
1753 deaths
Royal Navy officers
Royal Navy personnel of the War of the Austrian Succession
British military personnel of the Anglo-Spanish War (1727–1729)
British military personnel of the War of the Quadruple Alliance